Yardymly or Yardımlı may refer to:
 Yardymli District, a rayon of Azerbaijan
 Yardımlı, the capital city of Yardymly district
 Yardymly (meteorite), a meteorite that fell in Yardymly in 1959